Kępa Solecka  is a village in the administrative district of Gmina Łaziska, within Opole Lubelskie County, Lublin Voivodeship, in eastern Poland. Until 2005 it was part of Gmina Solec nad Wisłą in Masovian Voivodeship.

The village has a population of 93.

References

Villages in Opole Lubelskie County